A number of ships operated by the Williams Steamship Co Inc were named Willhilo

, 5,775 GRT, built by Ames Shipbuilding & Dry Dock
, 5,815 GRT, built by Sun Shipbuilding Co

Ship names